Jean Dieu-Donné Randrianasolo (born 26 May 1989) is a Malagasy international footballer who plays for CNaPS Sport, as a goalkeeper.

Career
He has played club football for CNaPS Sport.

He made his international debut for Madagascar in 2011.

References

1989 births
Living people
Malagasy footballers
Madagascar international footballers
CNaPS Sport players
Association football goalkeepers
2019 Africa Cup of Nations players